Gustave García (February 1, 1837 – June 12, 1925) was an Italian baritone opera singer and singing teacher.

Biography
Gustave García was born on February 1, 1837, in Milan, Italy, the son of  Manuel Patricio Rodríguez García (1805–1906) and the soprano Cécile Eugénie Mayer (1818–1880). He made his professional début as an operatic baritone in 1860 at Her Majesty's Theatre in London as Don Giovanni. He married and had a son, baritone Alberto García (1875–1946).

Best known in his second career, as a teacher, in 1880 he became a professor of singing at the Royal Academy of Music, where he worked till 1890. He also taught at the Guildhall School of Music from 1883 to 1910, and from 1884 at the Royal College of Music until his illness and final retirement. His pupils at the Royal College included Martyn Green and Walter Hyde. He died on June 12, 1925.

Works 
The Actors' Art: a Practical Treatise on Stage Declamation, Public Speaking and Deportment.  London: T. Pettitt & Co., 1882
The Singing Teacher's Note Book, a Short Synopsis of Voice Production for Teachers of Singing and Examination Candidates. London: Boosey & Co., 1910.
A guide to Solo Singing. Containing Full Instructions for Singing, with a Detailed Analysis of Some Well-Known Works and Songs. London: Stainer, Novello, Ewer & Co., 1914

Students
Béatrice La Palme

Genealogy

References

1837 births
1925 deaths
Italian operatic baritones
19th-century Italian male opera singers
Singers from Milan
Voice teachers